Elmer Adler (July 22, 1884 – January 11, 1962) was a book designer, collector, and graphic design educator.

Biography 
Elmer Adler was born July 22, 1884 in Rochester, New York.

Adler began collecting books and prints while working at his family's clothing firm in Rochester, New York. In 1922, he established Pynson Printers in New York City and began designing books with Burton Emmett and John T. Winterich. Pynson worked on publications including the New York Times and the American Mercury, and limited edition books for publishers including Alfred A. Knopf and Random House. In 1930, he began publishing The Colophon, A Book Collectors' Quarterly. He ended the publication in 1940 when he was invited to establish a Department of Graphic Arts at Princeton University. He retired from Princeton in 1952. In 1955, he established an art-of-the-book program,  La Casa del Libro, in Puerto Rico.  La Casa del Libro opened in 1956. In 1947, he received the AIGA Medal.

He died January 11, 1962.

References 

American graphic designers
Book designers
1884 births
1962 deaths
AIGA medalists